Richard William Pombo, GOIH (born January 8, 1961) is an American lobbyist for mining and water-management companies and former Republican member of the United States House of Representatives, having represented California's 11th congressional district from 1993 to 2007. Pombo lost a reelection bid to Democratic challenger Jerry McNerney on November 7, 2006.

On January 4, 2010, Pombo announced his candidacy for Congress in California's 19th congressional district to succeed retiring fellow Republican George Radanovich, although he did not live in the district. Pombo came in third in that four-way GOP race, with 20.8 percent of the votes.

Early life and career
Pombo was born in Tracy, California, 18 miles south of Stockton. He attended Cal Poly, Pomona, for three years before dropping out to work for his family's cattle and dairy business. He is a descendant of Portuguese immigrants. Pombo is married to the former Annette Cole and has three children. Even after being elected to Congress, he returned to his 500-acre (2 km2) ranch near Tracy every week. Pombo is a member of the Roman Catholic Church.

From 1990 to 1992, Pombo served on the Tracy City Council.

House of Representatives

1992 election

In 1992, Pombo won the Republican primary by defeating several candidates in a race for an open seat in a district newly created by redistricting. California had added seven seats in the House after the 1990 census. Pombo's strongest opponent in the Republican primary was moderate Republican Sandra Smoley, a Sacramento County Supervisor.

In November, although the district had a Democratic majority and was carried by Bill Clinton, Pombo nonetheless defeated Democrat Patti Garamendi (wife of current California Congressman John Garamendi).

1994–2000 elections
Pombo was reelected from this district in 1994, 1996, 1998, and 2000.

2002–2004 elections
For his first five terms, Pombo represented a district covering almost all of San Joaquin County and a large slice of Sacramento County. However, Pombo's district was significantly altered as a result of the 2000 round of redistricting. He lost his share of Sacramento County to the 3rd district, and lost most of Stockton to the 18th District. The district was pushed westward into the San Francisco Bay Area when it picked up some of the more Republican-leaning portions of Alameda and Contra Costa counties, which had previously been part of the East Bay–based 10th district. Pombo was reelected in 2002 and 2004 after the redistricting.

Political positions 
In Congress, Pombo had a conservative track record. In 1994, during the Republican Revolution, he was one of the signatories of the Contract with America. He was a member of the conservative Republican Study Committee. He was given the nickname "The Marlboro Man" by President George W. Bush.

Private property rights
Pombo is especially known for his defense of private property rights. This was spurred by the Southern Pacific Railroad's abandonment of the Altamont Pass route through Tracy. Pombo owned land adjacent to the abandoned railroad line. Pombo argued that the abandoned easement should legally revert to the adjacent property owners (such as himself) rather than to the local park district. He argued that as the easement was granted based on a promise that the land would be used for railroad purposes only, that the easements ended entirely when they were abandoned. Pombo's case resulted in Congress passing the Rails to Trails Act.

In a New York Times editorial (October 30, 2005), Pombo was called "an outspoken product of the extreme property rights movement." In 2005, he proposed legislation that would allow mining companies to buy lands on which they have staked claims, even if there is no evidence of valuable minerals on that land. According to the editorial, "This has nothing to do with mining, and everything to do with stealing land that is owned by the American people."

Pombo has written a book with Joseph Farah, founder of WorldNetDaily, about private property issues, entitled This Land is Our Land: How to End the War on Private Property. St. Martin's Press, New York, 1996.

Pombo was a co-founder of the San Joaquin County Citizen's Land Alliance, a group of farmers and other landowners who advocate private property rights and oppose government encroachment on these rights.

Iraq 
Pombo supported the Iraq War. In August 2006, anti-Iraq War activists criticized him, citing an estimate that taxpayers in the 11th congressional district paid $974 million for the war by that time.

Warrantless wiretapping
In a 2006 debate, Pombo said that "intelligence agents should obtain surveillance warrants before monitoring phone calls", but "less than five months later, he voted to allow warrantless wiretapping." He told the Tracy Press that his vote was consistent with his statement, and that although the bill allows a delay in obtaining a warrant, it requires that Congressional Intelligence Committees and the FISA Court be notified, this maintaining separation of powers among the branches of government. An advocate for the Center for Democracy and Technology said the bill went further than Pombo acknowledged insofar as it allowed for the warrantless collection of large amounts of data as long as no specific individual was being targeted (and that the bill in fact defined "electronic surveillance" as excluding such activity). Pombo's opponent in 2006, Jerry McNerney, who went on to defeat Pombo, opposed the bill.

Committee and caucuses

Committee assignments
From 2003 to 2007, Pombo was the Chairman of the House Resources Committee. The committee has oversight and sets policy on matters involving natural resources, Indian Country and Indian gaming. He was also a member of the House Agriculture Committee.

Pombo was also a co-chair of the House Energy Action Team (HEAT). This team's stated goal is to find alternative energy solutions.

Caucuses
Pombo was a member and former Chairman of the Congressional Western Caucus. The Western Caucus is made up of Western State members of Congress concerned about Endangered Species Act reform, water rights, private property rights and other issues affecting the western states.

Pombo was co-founder of the Portuguese Caucus, a coalition of Members of Congress who promote positive Portuguese-American relations. He has hosted prominent visitors from Portugal to the United States. The Portuguese government bestowed Pombo with the Grand Order of Infante D. Henrique, Portugal's highest civilian honor, in recognition of his efforts to improve Portuguese-American relations.

Pombo was an early member of the Congressional Hispanic Conference, a Republican caucus that promotes the interest of Hispanic and Portuguese Americans.

Environmental record

Pombo proposed legislation to sell roughly a quarter of the land managed by the National Park Service. In November 2005, Pombo and Jim Gibbons (R-NV) co-authored an amendment to the Federal Budget Reconciliation Bill easing restrictions of sale of federal lands to mining companies. This amendment was opposed by environmentalists, anti-growth advocates, and even some Republican Senators concerned about the measure's effects on hunting and fishing. The amendment narrowly passed the House, but was defeated in the Senate. The legislation was later described by his chief of staff as a "bureaucratic exercise" designed to evaluate the costs of not drilling in the Arctic National Wildlife Refuge (ANWR).

Pombo supported oil drilling in the ANWR, despite concerns about the ecosystem and opposition from moderate Republicans.

In September 2005, Pombo helped write a revision of the 1973 Endangered Species Act. The proposed revision "was widely denounced by environmentalists as a disturbing retreat from habitat protection and a paperwork nightmare for agencies seeking to revive the 1,268 threatened and endangered plants and animals in the country, 186 of which are in California." The bill did not pass.

By March 2006, Environmental Science & Technology reported that Pombo was coordinating efforts with Pac/West Communications to weaken the Endangered Species Act (ESA). Pac/West created the Save Our Species Alliance, an anti-environmental front group that campaigned for Pombo's bill to change the ESA.

The League of Conservation Voters, a nonpartisan PAC, assigned Pombo a lifetime average rating of 7 on a scale of 0 to 100. In 2005, he scored a 6. Subsequently, the organization named Pombo as one of the "Dirty Dozen" in 2006. LCV released an ad on October 31, 2006, citing Pombo's acceptance of $120,000 from oil companies and his ties to indicted lobbyist Jack Abramoff.

Rolling Stone ranked him one of the worst congressmen and called him "Enemy of the Earth". The Sierra Club called him an "eco-thug".

As the chairman of the House Resources Committee, Pombo blocked legislation that would have created the Wild Sky Wilderness area in Washington state, despite broad support for the bill.

His political revival was characterized as giving environmentalists "fits" by the San Jose Mercury News in addition to describing his perception by that community as similar to that of Exxon-Valdez Captain Joseph Hazelwood or the hunter that shot Bambi's mother.

The League of Conservation Voters added him to their Dirty Dozen list in 2010, even though this list is typically reserved for sitting members of Congress; and Warner Chabor, the organization's CEO, stated, "Having Pombo represent a district that includes Yosemite National Park is like electing Godzilla as mayor of Tokyo".

Controversies and criticisms
In 2006, Citizens for Responsibility and Ethics in Washington, a nonpartisan watchgroup founded in 2005 by liberal and Democratic Party activists released a report naming Pombo as one of the 13 most corrupt members of Congress. Pombo issued a statement where he denied the allegations and described the group as "a liberal-activist organization masquerading as a government watchdog group."

Corruption allegations

Pombo and his political action committee RICH PAC was among a dozen leaders in the House of Representatives reportedly under investigation as part of the corruption and influence-peddling scandal centered around disgraced Washington lobbyist Jack Abramoff, and his policy issues, including Indian gaming. Pombo had accepted more money from Abramoff than had any other member of Congress ($500,000). Fundraisers organized by Indian gaming interests and tied to the 2005 MLB All-Star Game are among those activities under scrutiny.

On January 8, 2006, the Los Angeles Times alleged that Pombo helped one of Abramoff's clients, the Mashpee Indians in Massachusetts, gain federal recognition as a tribe. In return, Pombo received campaign contributions from both the tribe and Abramoff.

In the 2006 cycle, Abramoff was one of the top donors to Pombo's political action committee. Several of Pombo's top five donors are political influence brokers from Detroit, who hosted several $5,000-per-person fundraisers for Pombo in their owners box at Comerica Park during the 2005 MLB All-Star Game. News reports indicated contributions from the two-day fundraising event would go to RICH Political Action Committee. However, Federal Election Commission reports filed by RICH PAC show only one such contribution. Apparently contributions were diverted to some other entity making it difficult to track who attended and contributed.

The Ilitch family, owners of the MLB Detroit Tigers and Detroit's MotorCity Casino, are also financial backers of various Indian tribes, including the Shinnecock Indian Nation, which is seeking to build a gaming casino on its reservation near Southampton, New York. Various issues and tribal disputes involving the Shinnecock were before the House Resources Committee chaired by Pombo just days after the fundraiser.

On October 11, 2006, it was reported that Pombo "says he never worked with disgraced lobbyist Jack Abramoff in his fourteen years in Congress, but billing records suggest at least two interactions between the two in 1996".

Freeways that could enhance owned real estate 
Various members of the Pombo family individually own more than  undeveloped near two proposed freeways. If even one of the proposed freeways is eventually built, the value of the property owned by Pombo's relatives and located near the proposed freeway will be worth far more than its currently assessed value.

Pombo led an effort to build a multilane freeway (State Route 130) through the mostly uninhabited Diablo Range to facilitate Bay Area-bound commuting from the greater Tracy area.

Windfarm regulations 
Pombo's home town of Tracy is close to a large wind farm on Altamont Pass. In 2004, Pombo's office sent a letter to then-Secretary of the Department of the Interior Gale Norton, urging the suspension of environmental guidelines opposed by the wind power industry. Pombo's parents have received hundreds of thousands of dollars in royalties from wind-powered turbines on their  ranch. Pombo owns an interest in his parents' ranch.

Payments to family 
Between 2000 and 2004, Pombo used his campaign and PAC funds to pay his brother Randall $272,000, and his wife (between 2003 and 2004) $85,000. In that 2003–04 campaign cycle, Pombo paid more to his family members—$217,000—than his opponent, Jerry McNerney, spent on his entire campaign. The two were paid for duties listed as bookkeeping, fundraising, consulting and other unspecified services.

After publicity about the payments to his family, Randall was taken off Pombo's payroll (total payments between January 2005 and mid-2006 were less than $7,000). Pombo's wife continued to be paid at the rate of $3,000 per month.

Mailings during 2004 campaign 
In October 2004, Pombo used the franking privileges afforded members of Congress to mail approximately 175,000 copies of a two-page leaflet that openly praised the House Resources Committee and the Bush administration for overturning Clinton Administration limits on snowmobiling in national parks. The leaflets were sent to snowmobile owners in the swing states of Wisconsin and Minnesota. Pombo authorized the expenditure of $68,081 from House Resources Committee funds for the mailing of the leaflets as "official business." House members are required to seek prior approval and obtain advisory opinions before sending out franked mail; no such approval was obtained prior to the October mailing.

2003 RV trip charged to the federal government
In August 2003, Pombo and his family rented an RV and "spent two weeks on vacation, stopping along the way to enjoy ... our national parks". The  trip included stops in the Grand Canyon, Yellowstone, Joshua Tree, Sequoia National Park, Kings Canyon National Park and Mount Rushmore, Badlands National Park, and other parks. The $4,935 cost of the rental was charged to the federal government, but was determined to be a more cost effective alternative to flying, renting a car, and staying in a hotel.

When asked in February 2006 about the trip—rules forbid government-funded travel for personal vacations, but allow lawmakers to bring family members on official trips—Pombo said that he had looked into flying into the parks by commercial air or charters, but found the costs to be excessive. After choosing to travel instead by RV, he invited his family along with him.

At Yellowstone, Pombo had a lengthy meeting with the park superintendent, which a spokesman charactizered as official. Pombo's visit to the Badlands National Park is in dispute: the secretary to the superintendent said he did not show; a spokesman for Pombo said that Pombo was certain he was there and met with a group of Native American tribal leaders nearby. Reports concerning Pombo's visit to Joshua Tree are also contradictory. The Los Angeles Times was told that Pombo had shown up for his meeting but "they were not there". The Tracy Press was told that Pombo met with the park's acting superintendent.

Officials from Sequoia and Kings Canyon national parks did not return calls seeking comment.

Investigation of Charles Hurwitz
One January 8, 2006, the Los Angeles Times reported that Pombo and Representative John Doolittle had joined with then-House Majority Leader Tom DeLay of Texas to oppose an investigation by federal banking regulators into the affairs of Houston millionaire Charles Hurwitz. The Times reported that "When the FDIC persisted, Doolittle and Pombo—both considered protegés of DeLay—used their power as members of the House Resources Committee to subpoena the agency's confidential records on the case, including details of the evidence FDIC investigators had compiled on Hurwitz." The investigation was ultimately dropped.

According to the Times, "Although Washington politicians frequently try to help important constituents and contributors, it is unusual for members of Congress to take direct steps to stymie an ongoing investigation by an agency such as the FDIC." The article concluded, "in the Hurwitz case, Doolittle and Pombo were in a position to pressure the FDIC and did so."

Corruption at the Interior Department
On September 23, 2006, the Central Valley Record reported that East Bay Representative George Miller and six other House Democrats had requested that Pombo hold "immediate" congressional hearings concerning oil lease payments to the Interior Department. The article noted that "Miller and his allies—including Pombo's challenger, wind power consultant Jerry McNerney—want oil companies such as Chevron to renegotiate contracts they inked with Clinton administration officials that failed to include language requiring the firms to pay taxes when oil prices pass $36 a barrel." Pombo "had a provision written into the House's offshore drilling legislation, which passed earlier this year, that would instead levy a fee on those firms that refuse to renegotiate their contracts."

Probed oil firm linked to Pombo
An Alaskan oil services company under federal investigation in connection with allegations of influence peddling has contributed nearly $18,000 to Pombo. The investigation sparked a Washington state candidate for the Senate to return his contributions from Anchorage-based VECO Corporation the day after the FBI raided offices of several Alaskan state legislators.

2006 re-election campaign

Amid these growing scandals, Pombo faced serious primary opposition for the first time since his initial race in 1992. His leading opponent was former congressman Pete McCloskey, a leading moderate Republican. Earlier, McCloskey had led an effort to find a viable primary challenger to Pombo. Pombo defeated McCloskey in the primary with 61 percent of the vote. McCloskey had been endorsed by The Sacramento Bee, the San Jose Mercury News, and the League of Conservation Voters. Seven weeks later, McCloskey endorsed Pombo's Democratic opponent, Jerry McNerney, who had won the Democratic primary over Steve Filson and Steve Thomas. McNerney received just over half of the Democratic vote and faced Pombo in the 2006 general election in November. McNerney had been Pombo's opponent in 2004.

On October 3, 2006, a Democratic-commissioned poll was released with McNerney leading Pombo 48 percent to 46 percent. There were two polls commissioned by the NRCC, but results weren't released. Based on these events, in early October, Congressional Quarterly changed their rating of this race from Republican Favored to Leans Republican. This was a significant development; Pombo had soundly defeated McNerney in 2004, taking 61 percent of the vote.

On November 7, 2006, Pombo was defeated by McNerney. McNerney got 53.1 percent of the vote to Pombo's 46.9 percent. Apart from prevailing national Democratic trends and the corruption allegations dogging him, Pombo was also the number one national target of environmental groups. Washington, D.C.-based Defenders of Wildlife spent more than $1 million on the race and commissioned the first poll in 2005 that showed Pombo to be vulnerable in his re-election bid. The Sierra Club sent over 300 volunteers and organizers to work for McNerney in the final weeks of the campaign. The group, allied with the League of Conservation Voters, also aired issue ads attacking Pombo. Pombo and Heather Wilson were the two Representatives targeted by the Humane Society, which spent over $100,000 in Pombo's district, including organizers. Since Pombo left office, no other Republican has represented a significant part of the Bay Area in Congress.

In a letter dated November 29, 2006 from PAC/West Communications, Pombo states, "I have accepted a position as Senior Partner at Pac/West, a full service political public relations firm with offices from California to Washington, D.C."

2010 Congressional campaign
On January 4, 2010, Pombo announced his candidacy for Congress in California's 19th congressional district after Congressman George Radanovich, a fellow Republican, announced he wouldn't run for reelection. The 19th neighbors Pombo's former 11th district and leans more Republican than the 11th. Pombo said he "didn't think [he] would ever run again, but when George Radanovich announced he wasn't running, my phone rang off the hook". Pombo faced Radanovich-backed state Senator Jeff Denham and former Fresno mayor Jim Patterson in the primary, which Jeff Denham won.

Pombo followed up his candidacy for Congress announcement by signing the Taxpayer Protection Pledge sponsored by Americans for Tax Reform on January 5, 2010. This marks the second time that Pombo signed the Pledge. He previously signed it as Representative of California's 11th congressional district. According to ATR, Pombo has a lifetime rating of 91% from their annual Congressional Scorecards.

Primary opponent Jeff Denham stated that Pombo was a liability to the Republican Party who has "given them a lot of material over the years", a reference to his various scandals and notoriety among environmentalists.

Electoral history

Honours
 Grand Officer of the Order of Prince Henry, Portugal (8 June 1996)

References

External links

Congressional

 
 Richard Pombo for Congress official 2010 campaign site

Profiles/voting records
 Profile San Diego Union Tribune
 Voting record, The Washington Post
 League of Conservation Voters gives Pombo a lifetime score of 7 on a scale of 0 to 100
 PoliticalFriendster – originally a Stanford University student project

Criticism
 Complaint against Pombo's franked mail
 Tribe's backers are Pombo's Donors by Indianz.com

News articles
 Pombo's position as public enemy number 1 for environmental groups m The Wall Street Journal
 Congressman's donors tied to tribal dispute, ABC News
 "Will the Real Mr. Pombo Please Stand Up?", profile of Pombo by High Country News
 Probed oil firm linked to Pombo. The Record September 7, 2006

|-

|-

1961 births
20th-century American politicians
21st-century American politicians
American people of Portuguese descent
California State Polytechnic University, Pomona alumni
Farmers from California
Living people
People associated with the Jack Abramoff scandals
People from Tracy, California
Ranchers from California
Republican Party members of the United States House of Representatives from California
Members of Congress who became lobbyists